Helldorado is the eighth studio album by American heavy metal band W.A.S.P., released in 1999.

Track listing
All songs written by Blackie Lawless

Japanese edition bonus tracks

Personnel
W.A.S.P.
 Blackie Lawless – lead vocals, rhythm guitar
 Chris Holmes – lead guitar
 Mike Duda – bass guitar, backing vocals
 Stet Howland – drums, backing vocals

Production
 Bill Metoyer  – engineer
 Eddy Schreyer, Gene Grimaldi  – mastering at Oasis Mastering, Burbank, California
 Roy Z  – technical support
 Kosh and Paul Pierandozzi  – art direction

Charts

References

1999 albums
W.A.S.P. albums
CMC International albums
Albums produced by Blackie Lawless